Rosell is a surname. Notable people with the surname include:

Ernst Rosell (1881–1953), Swedish sports shooter
Francisco Romá y Rosell (born 1784), Spanish royal official in Valladolid and New Spain
Josep Pons Rosell (born 1918), anthropologist and academic
Kaj Rosell (born 1947), Danish chess master
Oriol Rosell (born 1992), Spanish footballer
Rafael Rosell (born 1982), Filipino actor
Rosell Ellis (born 1975), American basketball player
Sandro Rosell (born 1964), former president of FC Barcelona

See also
Rossell

Catalan-language surnames